The Zeller Valley Railway, also called the Pfrimm Valley Railway (Pfrimmtalbahn), is a branch line from Langmeil to Monsheim. Originally built as a main line and part of the trunk route from Kaiserslautern to Worms, it lost its importance after the Second World War for national traffic. In 1983 passenger services were withdrawn, but, in 2001, it was reactivated on Sundays and holidays. A return to weekday services is currently not likely on cost grounds.

Literatur

References

External links 
 Streckeninformationen
 Weitere Informationen zur Geschichte
 Förderverein Eistalbahn e. V. – Fahrplaninformationen, Betriebsführung und Instandhaltung
 Donnersberg Touristik Verband e. V. Infrastrukturbetreiber der Strecke
Railway lines in Rhineland-Palatinate
North Palatinate
Palatinate (region)
Donnersbergkreis
Alzey-Worms